The Aberdeen micropolitan area may refer to:

The Aberdeen, South Dakota micropolitan area, United States
The Aberdeen, Washington micropolitan area, United States

See also
Aberdeen (disambiguation)